Gwen or Gwendoline Davies may refer to:

Gwendoline Davies (1882–1951) Welsh arts patron
Gwen Ffrangcon-Davies (1891–1992) Welsh actress
Gwen Davies (editor) (born 1964), Welsh editor and translator
Gwenan Davies (born 1994), Welsh cricketer

Fictional characters
Gwen Davies (Days of Our Lives)
Gwen Davies (Coronation Street)

See also
Gwen Davis (born 1936), American writer
Davies (surname)